Gurez is a village in Jagdishpur block of Bhojpur district, Bihar, India. As of 2011, its population was 1,189, in 159 households.

References 

Villages in Bhojpur district, India